Events in the year 1990 in Switzerland.

Incumbents
Federal Council:
Otto Stich 
Jean-Pascal Delamuraz 
Kaspar Villiger
Arnold Koller (President)
Flavio Cotti 
René Felber 
Adolf Ogi

Events
1 April - Six referendums are done, the subjects being four popular initiatives, a federal resolution on viticulture and an amendment to the federal law on the organisation of the federal judiciary.  All six are rejected by voters. 
23 September - A further four referendums are held, on two popular initiatives to phase out nuclear power and to stop the construction of any new nuclear power plants, as well as on a federal resolution on the energy article in the Swiss Federal Constitution and an amendment to the federal law on road traffic. The nuclear power phase-out was rejected, but the other three proposals were approved.

Births
 30 January - Luca Sbisa, ice hockey player
 1 May - Patrick Schelling.
 22 June - Mario Dolder.
 21 July - Whitney Toyloy, Swiss model, Miss Switzerland 2008
 26 August - Marcel Aregger.
 1 September - Mélanie René.
 5 October - Andreas Wittwer.

Deaths

 31 May - Willy Spühler.
 27 August - Armin Scheurer.
 21 November - Pierre Musy.
 30 December - Herman Volz, painter and designer, 86

References

 
Years of the 20th century in Switzerland
1990s in Switzerland